Aviz may refer to:
Aviz, Fars, a village in Fars Province, Iran
Aviz, the medieval name of Avis, Portugal
Aviz, South Khorasan, a village in South Khorasan Province, Iran
Tarik Aviz, a village in Lorestan Province, Iran
Aviz Rural District, in Fars Province, Iran
House of Aviz, a dynasty of the kings of Portugal
Order of Aviz, a Portuguese Order of Chivalry
Order of Aviz (Brazil), a former Imperial Brazilian military order, originating from the ancient Portuguese Military Order of Aviz

See also
Avis (disambiguation)